The William Spratling Museum (Museo Guillermo Spratling) is a museum in Taxco, Guerrero, Mexico.  The museum contains 293 archeological pieces that were part of William Spratling's personal collection. There are bone and shell pieces, objects made with semi-precious stones, as well as jars and figurines, all from various parts of Mesoamerica.  The most outstanding pieces are a skull covered in jade and a stele. There is a collection of counterfeit artifacts as well. Another area is devoted to the silverwork designs and the workshops that Spratling created in Taxco and Taxco el Viejo.

References

External links
Museum information from the National Institute of Anthropology and History

Buildings and structures in Taxco
Museums in Guerrero
History museums in Mexico
Archaeological museums in Mexico